The Confederate Spy is a 1910 American silent drama film produced by Kalem Company and directed by Sidney Olcott. A story about the Civil War.

Production notes
The production was filmed in Jacksonville, Florida.

References
 The Film Index, 1910, February 5, p 20; February 12, pp 14–15
 The Moving Picture World, Vol 6, p 229; p 258; p 277
 The New York Dramatic Mirror, February 19, 1910, p 18
 Supplement to the Bioscope, August 22, 1912

External links
 AFI Catalog

 The Confederate Spy website dedicated to Sidney Olcott

1910 films
1910 drama films
1910 short films
American black-and-white films
Silent American drama films
American Civil War spy films
American silent short films
Films directed by Sidney Olcott
Films set in Florida
Films shot in Jacksonville, Florida
1910s American films
American drama short films
1910s English-language films